Helen Conway-Ottenheimer (born 1964) is a Canadian politician, who was elected to the Newfoundland and Labrador House of Assembly in the 2019 provincial election. She represents the electoral district of Harbour Main as a member of the Newfoundland and Labrador Progressive Conservative Party. She was re-elected in the 2021 provincial election.

Conway-Ottenheimer served on the executive of the youth branch of the PC Party, and became its president at age 20. She is a lawyer by trade and has practiced in the areas of human rights law and criminal defence.

She is married to former MHA John Ottenheimer.

References

1964 births
Living people
Progressive Conservative Party of Newfoundland and Labrador MHAs
Women MHAs in Newfoundland and Labrador
21st-century Canadian politicians
21st-century Canadian women politicians